The Fitchburg State Falcons football team represents Fitchburg State University in college football at the NCAA Division III level. The Falcons are members of the Massachusetts State Collegiate Athletic Conference, fielding its team in the Massachusetts State Collegiate Athletic Conference since 2013. The Falcons play their home games at Elliot Field in Fitchburg, Massachusetts. 

FSU is known for breaking the (at the time) longest college football losing streak in 1989, breaking a losing streak of thirty-plus games. The school was featured in many news sources, such as The New York Times, ESPN, and many local newspapers. The game was won when the ball was picked off and returned for a 96-yard touchdown, which generated momentum for the rest of the game to lead the team to a 33–7 victory, the first in over four years. The later scores were aided by the amazing defensive strength of FSU, with five interceptions, and three fumbles, thanks to Paul Camick, roommate of the player who made the original pick–six, and his unbearable strength, forcing a fumble to take the team home for the victory. 

Their head coach is Zachary Shaw, who took over the position for the 2023 season.

Conference affiliations
 New England Football Conference (1986–2012)
 Massachusetts State Collegiate Athletic Conference (2013–present)

List of head coaches

Key

Coaches

Year-by-year results

Notes

References

External links
 

 
American football teams established in 1984
1984 establishments in Massachusetts